Inge Garstedt (born 1947) is a Swedish politician of the Moderate Party. She has been a member of the Riksdag since 2006 and a replacement member of the Riksdag in 1991.

External links 
Inge Garstedt at the Riksdag website

Members of the Riksdag from the Moderate Party
Living people
1947 births
Women members of the Riksdag
20th-century Swedish women politicians
20th-century Swedish politicians
21st-century Swedish women politicians